Căușeni is a town and the administrative center of Căușeni District, Moldova.

Its population at the 2014 census was 15,939, of which 12,056 Moldovans, 1,119 Romanians, 747 Russians, 545 Ukrainians, 204 Bulgarians, 69 Gagauzians, 12 Gypsies, and 1,187 other/undeclared.

History

The 17th century Assumption of Our Lady Church is the oldest surviving building in the town. Executed by Walachian painters in a late Byzantine-Romanian style, the interiors feature religious scenes and iconography in vibrant reds, gold, and blues.

At one time it was a vibrant Jewish shtetl. In 1897, 45 percent of the population (1,675) was Jewish, most working in agriculture.

Notable people
 Bianna Golodryga, journalist at CNN
 Alexandru Pînzari, former Moldovan Chief of Police and former Moldovan Minister of Defence

Gallery

References

External links

World Monuments Fund page on Assumption of Our Lady Church

Cities and towns in Moldova
Bendersky Uyezd
Tighina County (Romania)
Ținutul Nistru
Căușeni District